Pytlivyy  (also transliterated Pytlivy or Pytliviy, "Inquisitive") is a Project 1135M Burevestnik-class ("Petrel") Guard Ship (SKR) or 'Krivak II'-class frigate that served with the Soviet and Russian  navies. Launched on 16 April 1981, the vessel was designed to operate as an anti-submarine vessel, with an armament built around the Metel Anti-Ship Complex. Part of the Black Sea Fleet, the vessel undertook friendly visits to Algeria, Greece, and Malta, at the last hosting a meeting between the Soviet and US leaders Mikhail Gorbachev and George H. W. Bush. In 1991, the ship was transferred to the Russian Navy following the dissolution of the Soviet Union, and, following a three-year repair, took part in a number of joint exercises with other navies. For example, 2003 found the vessel operating alongside the Indian Navy and 2005 with the Italian Navy. In 2006, Pytlivyy took part in NATO's Operation Active Endeavour and subsequently formed part of Russia's presence in the Mediterranean Sea in the war against terrorism in the early 21st century. The ship also operated as part of the Russian intervention in the Syrian civil war. As of 2021, Pytlivyy remains in service.

Design and development
Pytlivyy was one of eleven Project 1135M ships launched between 1975 and 1981. Project 1135, the Burevestnik ("Petrel") class, was envisaged by the Soviet Navy as a less expensive complement to the Project 1134A Berkut A (NATO reporting name 'Kresta II') and Project 1134B Berkut B (NATO reporting name 'Kara') classes of anti-submarine ships. Project 1135M was an improvement developed in 1972 with slightly increased displacement and heavier guns compared with the basic 1135. The design, by N. P. Sobolov, combined a powerful missile armament with good seakeeping for a blue water role. The ships were designated Guard Ship (SKR) to reflect their substantial greater anti-ship capability than the earlier members of the class and the Soviet strategy of creating protected areas for friendly submarines close to the coast. NATO forces called the vessels 'Krivak II'-class frigates.

Power was provided by two  M7K power sets, each consisting of a combination of a  DK59 and a  M62 gas turbine arranged in a COGAG installation and driving one fixed-pitch propeller. The ship's complement was 194, including 23 officers.

Armament and sensors
Pytlivyy was designed for anti-submarine warfare around four URPK-5 Rastrub missiles (NATO reporting name SS-N-14 'Silex'), backed up by a pair of quadruple launchers for  torpedoes and a pair of RBU-6000  Smerch-2 anti-submarine rocket launchers. Both the URPK-5 and the torpedoes also had anti-ship capabilities. Defence against aircraft was provided by forty 4K33 OSA-M (SA-N-4 'Gecko') surface to air missiles which were launched from two sets of twin-arm ZIF-122 launchers. Two  AK-100 guns were mounted aft in a superfiring arrangement.

The ship had a well-equipped sensor suite, including a single MR-310A Angara-A air/surface search radar, Don navigation radar, the MP-401S Start-S Electronic Support Measures (ESM) system and the Spectrum-F laser warning system. Fire control for the guns was provided by a MR-143 Lev-214 radar. The vessel was also equipped with the PK-16 decoy-dispenser system which used chaff as a form of missile defense.

Construction and career
Laid down by on 27 June 1979 with the yard number 169 at the Yantar Shipyard in Kaliningrad, Pytlivyy was launched on 16 April 1981. The ship was the eleventh and last of the class built at the yard and took 1.3 million hours to build, a saving of 39% compared to the first of the class. The vessel, named for a Russian word that can be translated as inquisitive, was commissioned on 30 November and joined the Black Sea Fleet.

Soviet Navy service

Soon after shakedown, Pytlivy was sent on missions to foreign ports to promote friendly relationships between the Soviet Union and other nations. On 30 May 1988, the ship arrived at the port of Algiers, Algeria, for a friendly visit, staying until 3 June. On 2 December the following year, the vessel hosted a meeting between the Soviet Premier Mikhail Gorbachev and the US President George H. W. Bush in Valletta, Malta. The ship visited Piraeus, Greece, on 23 January 1990, during which a band composed of sailors from Pytlivy and other Soviet musicians played a concert on the shorefront and the crew took part in sporting events with Greek sailors.

Russian Navy service
With the dissolution of the Soviet Union on 26 December 1991, Pytlivyy was transferred to the Russian Navy. The ship remained part of the Black Sea Fleet. On 7 September 1993, the vessel returned to the Yantar shipyard to be repaired. The process took little over three years before the ship was recommissioned and reentered service. The voyage was preceded by significant diplomatic activity with Turkey to ensure the smooth passage of the warships from the Black Sea. This was a radical change in Russian naval capability. Previously, they had to rely on members of the Baltic Fleet serving in the Mediterranean Sea due to restrictions imposed by Turkey transiting the strait under the Montreux Convention.

By 2001, Pytlivyy was one of the few Project 1135M ships still in service. Over the following years, the vessel was involved in several joint operations with other navies. On 22 May 2003, the vessel took part in the first INDRA exercise with the Indian Navy. 11 July 2005 found the vessel in Naples, Italy, taking part in a two-day visit that included welcoming Italian Navy sailors onboard. On 15 September the following year, the vessel joined the NATO Operation Active Endeavour, undertaking anti-terrorist patrols in the Mediterranean Sea. The inclusion of a Russian vessel in a NATO operation was innovative, controversial, and brief, lasting one week. The operation involved the sharing of communication codes, operating procedures and other secret information that would normally be restricted to allies only, and would have been unheard of during the Cold War. It led to other similar collaborations between Russia and NATO over the following years.

Subsequently taking part in the Russian intervention in the Syrian civil war, Pytlivyy remained as part of the Russian presence in the Mediterranean. The fleet, which included the battlecruiser , was ostensibly to protect Russian shipping from terrorism and piracy, and operated from a forward base in Tartus, Syria. The vessel remains in service as of 2021, operating between the Black and the Mediterranean Seas.

References

Citations

Bibliography

 
 
 
 
 
 
 
 
 
 
 
 

1981 ships
Cold War frigates of the Soviet Union
Krivak-class frigates
Krivak-class frigates of the Russian Navy
Ships built at Yantar Shipyard
Ships built in the Soviet Union